= Election of President Trump =

Election of President Trump may refer to the two US presidential elections in which he was elected president.

- 2016 United States presidential election
- 2024 United States presidential election
